Roman Hermann (born 27 March 1953 in Schaan) is a Liechtensteiner former cyclist.

Major results

1979
3rd Derny, UEC European Track Championships
1980
1st Six Days of Zürich (with Horst Schütz)
1981
1st Six Days of Hanover (with Horst Schütz)
2nd Madison, UEC European Track Championships
1982
3rd Points race, UCI World Track Championships
1984
1st Six Days of Buenos Aires (with Eduardo Trillini)
2nd Madison, UEC European Track Championships
1985
1st Six Days of Dortmund (with Josef Kristen)
1986
1st Six Days of Cologne (with Sigmund Hermann)
1st Six Days of Madrid (with Sigmund Hermann)
1987
1st Six Days of Münster (with Josef Kristen)
1st Six Days of Stuttgart (with Josef Kristen)
1st Six Days of Dortmund (with Danny Clark)
1st Six Days of Bassano del Grappa (with Moreno Argentino and Anthony Doyle)
1st Madison, UEC European Track Championships (with Josef Kristen
1988
1st Six Days of Ghent (with Urs Freuler)
1st Six Days of Copenhagen (with Hans-Henrik Ørsted)
1st Six Days of Stuttgart (with Dietrich Thurau), 
1st Six Days of Grenoble (with Charly Mottet)
3rd Madison, UEC European Track Championships
3rd Derny, UEC European Track Championships
1989
1st Six Days of Bremen (with Andreas Kappes)

References

1953 births
Living people
Liechtenstein male cyclists